The Ghāfirī (also Ghafiri or al-Ghafiriyah) are one of two major tribal confederations of Oman and the Trucial Coast, the other being the Hināwī. Both confederations claim their origin to the Bedouin tribe and the Ghafiri also trace their roots to the Nizari or Adnani tribes. Both groups provided support to the ruling sultans to further their own interests. The Ghafiri are Sunni Muslim.

History
The Ghafiri confederation of the Ibāḍī Imamate was established in the mid 8th century. In the election of a new imam (leader) who functioned as ”both temporal and religious leader of the community”, the leaders of both confederations played an important role in governance. The Ghafiris and Hinawis confederations existed during the civil wars in Persia which had resulted from Nadir Shah’s intervention in the period between 1737–38 and 1742–44. The confederations played a role in the political history of Oman, with Omani tribes being affiliated with one or the other confederation. Because of the Ghafiri's support of Saif ibn Sultan II, a clash occurred between the two confederations in 1748 in which leaders of both tribes died.

In the late 19th century, Ghafiri, numbering approximately 20,000 people, lived in the areas of Bereymi Proper and Su'areb. Ghafiri tribes of that time were the Na'im, the Beni Ka'ib, the Beni Kattab and El-Daramikeh. A constant feature of the rivalry of the two groups was also witnessed in the support they provided to the ruling sultans to further their own interests. During the conflicts between the two groups and the rivalry of the imam and the sultan, the British eventually played an intermediary role, and this resulted in a stable Sultanate in Oman which lasted between 1920 and 1954.

Culture
The Ghafiri's religious affiliation is Sunni Muslim, abiding by the Wahhabi tenets. Na'im are Ghafiri by political affiliation. Although rivalry continues in the modern day between Ghafiri and Hinawis, it is generally limited to their opposing football teams.

References

Bibliography

Ethnic groups in Oman
Ethnic groups in the Middle East